Blue Sky, BlueSky or Bluesky may refer to:

Places
Blue Sky, Colorado, U.S.
Bluesky, Alberta, Canada

Science
Blue skies research (also called blue sky science), scientific research in domains where "real-world" applications are not immediately apparent
Bluesky Formation, a stratigraphic unit of Lower Cretaceous age in the Western Canada Sedimentary Basin
Diffuse sky radiation, solar radiation reaching the Earth's surface after Rayleigh scattering
Rayleigh scattering, which causes the sky to appear blue.

Art, entertainment, and media

Animation and gaming
 Blue Sky Studios, a computer animation studio acquired by the Walt Disney Company in 2019
 BlueSky Software, a defunct video game company
 Looking Glass Studios, a computer game developer originally known as Blue Sky Productions

Film and television
 Blue Sky (1955 film), a Swedish comedy film
 Blue Sky (1994 film), a film starring Jessica Lange and Tommy Lee Jones
 Blue Sky (TV channel), a Greek regional television station
 Blue Sky, blue methamphetamine in the American TV series Breaking Bad, 2008

Music
 Blue Sky Records, a record label started by manager Steve Paul
 Blue Sky (album), a 2012 album by Jinny Ng

Songs 
 "Blue Sky" (song), a song by The Allman Brothers Band
 "Blue Sky", a song by rapper Common, from the album The Dreamer/The Believer
 "Blue Sky", a song by Patti Griffin, from the album Flaming Red
 "Blue Sky", a song by Emily West
 "The Blue Sky", a song by A-ha, from the album Hunting High and Low

Other art, entertainment, and media
 Blue Sky (manga), a 2007 Japanese manga
 Blue sky memo, a document authored by the Central Intelligence Agency (CIA)

Business
 Blue Sky Airlines, an airline in Armenia
 Blue Sky Aviation Services, a domestic airline in Kenya
 Blue Sky Beverage Company, a soft drink manufacturer
 Blue sky law, state laws in the United States that regulate the offering and sale of securities

Other uses
 Bluesky (protocol), a Twitter-led initiative for a distributed social network protocol
 BlueSky Charter School, an online school for Minnesota citizens
 BlueSky Open Platform, an open source e-learning solution
 Blue Sky, a rainbow code for the Fairey Fireflash air-to-air missile
 Blue Sky navigation pod, an airborne navigational/attack pod
 Blue Sky (artist) (born 1938), American painter and sculptor formerly known as Warren Edward Johnson
 Blue Sky Solar Racing, a solar car racing team based at the University of Toronto

See also
 Blue Skies (disambiguation)
 Black sky (disambiguation)
 Big Sky (disambiguation)
 "Mr. Blue Sky", a song by ELO